Muraenichthys gymnopterus is an eel in the family Ophichthidae (worm/snake eels). It was described by Pieter Bleeker in 1853, originally under the genus Muraena. It is a marine, tropical eel which is known from the western Pacific Ocean, including China, Indonesia, and India. It inhabits rocky reefs in shallow, warm seas.

The diet of M. gymnopterus consists of finfish and phytoplankton.

References

Fish described in 1853
gymnopterus